The Yorke Prize is awarded annually by the Faculty of Law at the University of Cambridge for an essay of between 30,000 and 100,000 words on a legal subject, including the history, analysis, administration and reform of law, "of exceptional quality, which makes a substantial contribution to its relevant field of legal knowledge."

The prize, awarded from the Yorke Fund, is open to any graduate of, or any person who is or has been registered as a graduate student of, the university.

Endowment
The Yorke Fund was endowed in 1873 by the will of Edmund Yorke (b. 8 February 1787, d.29 November 1871), alumnus of Rugby School, scholar and later Fellow of St Catharine's College, Cambridge and barrister of Lincoln's Inn, London.

Yorke Prize winners
Winners of the Yorke Prize include:

 Courtney Stanhope Kenny, 1877, 1878, 1879
 Perceval Maitland Laurence, 1878
 Thomas Edward Scrutton 1882, 1884, 1885, 1886
 Richard Cockburn Maclaurin, 1898
 Richard Turner, 1923
 C. J. Hamson, 1932
 J. W. Brunyate, 1929
 Norman Bentwich
 S. F. C. Milsom, 1948
 Robin Cooke, Baron Cooke of Thorndon, 1955
 Norman St John-Stevas, Baron St John of Fawsley, 1957
 Brian Coote
 John Guy
 John H. Langbein
 Sir John Baker, 1975
 Antônio Augusto Cançado Trindade, 1977
 Francis Gurry, 1980
 Paul McHugh, 1988
 Neil Jones
 Tobias Schaffner, 2015
 Joe Sampson, 2017
 Visa A.J. Kurki, 2018
 Liron Shmilovits, 2019
 Raffael N. Fasel, 2020 
 Michael Foran 2021
 Stevie Martin, 2021
  Alex Waghorn, 2022
 Maayan Menashe, 2022

References

Legal awards
Awards established in 1873
Awards and prizes of the University of Cambridge
Scholarships in the United Kingdom
Awards honoring alumni